Mano Po Legacy: The Flower Sisters is a Philippine television drama series broadcast by GMA Network. The series is the third installment of Mano Po Legacy. Directed by Ian Loreños, it stars Aiko Melendez, Beauty Gonzalez, Thea Tolentino, and Angel Guardian. It premiered on October 31, 2022 on the network's Telebabad line up replacing What We Could Be. The series concluded on January 13, 2023 with a total of 47 episodes. It was replaced by Luv Is in its timeslot.

Cast and characters 
Lead cast
 Aiko Melendez as Lily Yap Chua-Tan
 Beauty Gonzalez as Violet Ty Chua-Gomez
 Thea Tolentino as Dahlia Morales Chua
 Angel Guardian as Iris Ong Chua

Supporting cast
 Rafael Rosell as Julian Gomez
 Isabel Rivas as Aurora Ty-Chua
 Maila Gumila as Divina Chua
 Tanya Garcia as Marilou Ong
 Marcus Madrigal as Redmond Tan
 Sue Prado as Belinda Morales
 Bodjie Pascua as Felino Go
 Miggs Cuaderno as James Petersen Chua Tan
 Will Ashley as Andrew James Chua Tan
 Carlo San Juan as Elvin Delos Santos
 Mika Reins as Kayla Gomez
 Casie Banks as Jade Lee
 Dustin Yu as Kenneth Chan
 Kimson Tan as Steven Yu
 Shecko Apostol as Benjo Que

Recurring cast
 Adrienne Vergara as Clarisse
 Gertrude Hahn as Corrine
 Dovee Park as Trisha
 Sunshine Teodoro as Precy
 AZ Martinez as Jessica Tang
 Johnny Revilla as Miguel Gomez
 JC Tiuseco as Robert Collantes
 Samby Magno as Joni

Guest cast
 Mikee Quintos as Carmen Yap-Chua
 Lloyd Samartino as Leopoldo Go Chua
 Paul Salas as young Leopoldo
 Yvette Sanchez as young Lily
 Althea Ablan as young Violet
 Adriana Agcaoili as adult Aurora
 Sophia Senoron as young Aurora
 Cheska Fausto as young Divina
 Gian Magdangal as adult Felino
 Larkin Castor as young Felino
 Small Laude as herself
 Sandro Muhlach as Charlie Ty Chua
 Nicole Laurel Asensio as Celeste Villagracia
 Bella Thompson as Paula
 Anikka Camaya as Pamela dela Cruz
 Ray An Dulay as Police Officer Salcedo
 Boy Laguipo as Arturo Bendigo

Episodes

References

External links
 
 

2022 Philippine television series debuts
2023 Philippine television series endings
Filipino-language television shows
GMA Network drama series
Television shows set in the Philippines